Ottawa was the name of a provincial electoral district that elected one member to the Legislative Assembly of Ontario, Canada from 1867 to 1894 and two members from 1894 to 1908.

The riding was created when Ontario became a province in 1867, initially consisting solely of the City of Ottawa. It was expanded in the 1894 redistribution to include the villages of Ottawa East and Hintonburg, the unincorporated community of Mechanicsville and that part of the Township of Nepean located in Lots 36, 37, 38 in Concession A of Ottawa Front (mostly the area around the Bayswater community, today the area east of Parkdale Avenue and north of Carling Avenue). The riding was abolished in the 1908 redistribution into Ottawa East and Ottawa West.

When the Ottawa district had two members, 1894-1908, each voter could cast up to two votes (Block Voting).

Members of Provincial Parliament

Election results

|-

|Conservative (Equal Rights)
|D. Donaldson
|align="right"|1,964
|align="right"|36.76

References

Centennial Edition of a History of the Electoral Districts, Legislatures and Ministries of the Province of Ontario 1867-1967

Provincial electoral districts of Ottawa
Former provincial electoral districts of Ontario